Van Van Wey (July 9, 1924 – July 14, 1991) was a NASCAR Grand National Series driver from West Terre Haute, Indiana, U.S.A.

Career
He occasionally drove in the 1954 and 1955 seasons predominantly in his #10 Ford vehicle that was owned by Ray Fletcher.

Starting an average of 40th place and finishing an average of 26th place, Wey earned exactly $555 in career winnings ($ when adjusted for inflation). One of his notable appearance was at the 1955 Southern 500, one of the most prestigious NASCAR races done prior to the inaugural running of the Daytona 500. During his career, Van Wey qualified for all of his races.

References

1924 births
1991 deaths
NASCAR drivers
People from Vigo County, Indiana
Racing drivers from Indiana